Minas Novas is a municipality in the northeast of the Brazilian state of Minas Gerais. In 2020, the population was 31,497 in a total area of 1,810 km². The elevation of the urban area is 635 meters. It is part of the IBGE statistical meso-region of Jequitinhonha and the micro-region of Capelinha. It became a municipality in 1730.

The economy is based on cattle raising, services and subsistence agriculture, with the main crops being coffee, rice, beans, sugarcane and corn. There were plantations of eucalyptus trees for charcoal production. In 2005, there were 3,367 rural producers but only 19 tractors. 10,500 persons were dependent on agriculture. In 2005, there were ten public health clinics, one of them carrying out diagnosis and complete therapy. There was one hospital with 69 beds. Educational needs were met by 68 primary schools, five middle schools and ten nursery schools. There were 867 automobiles in 2006, giving a ratio of 35 inhabitants per automobile (there were 1,290 motorcycles). There was one bank in 2007.

Neighboring municipalities are Capelinha, Chapada do Norte, Leme do Prado, Novo Cruzeiro, Setubinha, Turmalina and Virgem da Lapa. The distance to Belo Horizonte is 500 km.

Social indicators
Minas Novas is ranked low on the MHDI and was one of the poorest municipalities in the state and in the country in 2000.
MHDI: .633 (2000)
State ranking: 785 out of 853 municipalities
National ranking: 4,061 out of 5,138 municipalities in 2000
Life expectancy: 67
Literacy rate: 66 
Combined primary, secondary and tertiary gross enrolment ratio: .739
Per capita income (monthly): R$81.00 

These figures can be compared with those of Poços de Caldas, which had an MHDI of .841, the highest in the state of Minas Gerais. The highest in the country was São Caetano do Sul in the state of São Paulo with an MHDI of .919. The lowest was Manari in the state of Pernambuco with an MHDI of .467 out of a total of 5,504 municipalities in the country as of 2004. At last count Brazil had 5,561 municipalities so this might have changed at the time of this writing.

Minas Novas was an important center for diamond exploration during the colonial period. The name is derived from these diamond mines. Today it is famous for its handicrafts, especially figurines made of clay. An important religious festival takes place in June, celebrating the Virgin of the Rosary, organized by the Black Folk Brotherhood of Our Lady of the Rosary. There is a strong African influence in the dances and costumes since this was a place that was mainly settled by slaves and later ex-slaves.

See also
List of municipalities in Minas Gerais

References

Municipalities in Minas Gerais